Mextremist! Greatest Hits is the name of a greatest hits album by extreme metal band Brujeria. The album is more like a B-sides compilation, including songs not available on the LPs edited by Roadrunner Records.

Album information
The album cover is a parody of a Mexican magazine called ¡Alarma!, which emphasizes sensational crime stories and has previously been banned—like the band, in certain instances, for its gruesome content/pictures.

The song "Asesino" is by Brujeria, not the artist Asesino. This song features Tony Campos from the band Static-X.

Track listing
"Seis Seis Seis" (Six Six Six) – 1:23
"Santa Lucía" (Saint Lucy) – 0:21
"Sacrificio" (Sacrifice) – 1:22
"Machetazos" (Machete Attack) – 1:42
"Padre Nuestro" (Our Father) – 2:21
"Molestando Niños Muertos" (Molesting Dead Children) – 3:02
"Castigo del Brujo" (Punishment of the Warlock) – 1:37
"Matando Güeros '97" (Killing Blondes) – 3:12
"Narco-Peda" (Narco-Drunkenness) – 2:43
"Brujo Cirujano" (Warlock Surgeon) – 1:55
"Asesino" (Assassin) – 2:33
"Hechando Chingasos [Live '97]" – 3:56
"Poseído" (Possessed) – 0:47
"Cristo de la Roca" (Christ of the Rock) – 1:06
"Papa Capado" (Castrated Pope) – 3:17
"Seran Míos Para Siempre [Fantasma Remix]" (They Will Be Mine Forever) – 2:19
"Mecosario [Pinche Peach Torsido Remix]" (Cumasaurous) – 3:33
"Marijuana [Escobar Remix]" – 4:24

References

Brujeria (band) albums
2001 greatest hits albums